Marc Westphalen (born 14 July 1977 in Hamburg) is a German sprint canoer who competed in the early 2000s. He won a bronze medal in the K-2 1000 m event at the 2001 ICF Canoe Sprint World Championships in Poznań.

References

German male canoeists
Living people
1977 births
ICF Canoe Sprint World Championships medalists in kayak